Kumbakonam was a Lok Sabha constituency in Tamil Nadu. It existed from 1951 to 1977 when it was abolished

Assembly segments
Kumbakonam Lok Sabha constituency was previously composed of the following assembly segments:
 Kumbakonam
Thiruvaiyaru
Valangaimaan
Papanasam
Aduthurai
 Jayankondam

Members of the Parliament

Election Results

General Election 1971

General Election 1967

General Election 1962

General Election 1957

General Election 1952

References

 Election Commission of India

See also
 Kumbakonam
 List of Constituencies of the Lok Sabha

Thanjavur district
Constituencies disestablished in 1977
Former Lok Sabha constituencies of Tamil Nadu
Former constituencies of the Lok Sabha